Comicstaan is an Indian stand-up comedy competition television series created by Only Much Louder for Amazon Prime Video. The show brings together budding Indian comedians to find the next big name in stand-up comedy.

The series premiere and three following episodes dropped on 13 July 2018. In its first week, Comicstaan became the most watched show on Amazon Prime Video in India. The judges for Season 1 were Biswa Kalyan Rath, Tanmay Bhat , Sapan Verma, Kaneez Surka, Kanan Gill, Kenny Sebastian, and Naveen Richard and it was hosted by Abish Mathew and Sumukhi Suresh. The grand finale of Season 1 was released on 17 August 2018 and Nishant Suri, a contestant from Noida, emerged as the winner.

On 6 August 2018, Comicstaan was renewed for a second season. Comedian Zakir Khan was reported to be included in the lineup of judges and mentors for Season 2 with Sapan Verma and Naveen Richard not expected to return. Additionally, Tanmay Bhat was dropped from Season 2 on 14 November 2018, a month after he was ousted from All India Bakchod due to allegations of inaction against sexual harassment. Season 2 premiered on 12 July 2019 with the addition of judges Neeti Palta and Sumukhi Suresh (who co-hosted Season 1) as judges and mentors and Urooj Ashfaq joining as co-host.
 
Comicstaan Season 2 premiered on 12 July 2019 where it released its first three episodes along with one bonus episode. This season had Biswa Kalyan Rath, Kaneez Surka, Kanan Gill, Zakir Khan, Neeti Palta and Kenny Sebastian as judges. 

The winner of Season 1 was Nishant Suri. Season 2 had combined winners namely Samay Raina and Akash Gupta. The winner of Season 3 is Aashish Solanki.

Hosts and judges

Series overview

Selection process and format Season 1
In September and October 2017, auditions for Season 1 took place in Mumbai, New Delhi, and Bangalore in the form of open mics. No contestants were chosen on the spot; videos of their performances were viewed by all judges and hosts together before they decided on the best 10.

During the course of the shows, the 10 contestants went through 7 rounds of performances in order to secure a spot in the grand finale. Each round, the contestants performed in a different genre of comedy and, unlike most competition television series, there were no eliminations till the last round. Comedic genres the contestants performed in included anecdotal, topical, observational, improv, sketch, comedy of terrors, and alternative comedy.

Before each round, the contestants were mentored in each genre by one of the judges, who is touted as the expert of that specific type of comedy. The contestants had a week to prepare fresh material and practice before performing that set live in front of an audience and the judges. After their performance, each contestant was given a score, between 1 and 10, by both the audience and all the judges (except for the expert for that round). Each contestant was given feedback by the judges before revealing their score. Two separate scores were revealed to each contestant - an average of the audience's score and an average of the judges'. The mean of both scores became the final score of the round for each contestant. The finals scores were aggregated each round and, at the end of the 7th round, 5 contestants receiving the best aggregate scores were given places in the finale.

For round 4 (improv), the 10 contestants were separated into 2 groups of 5. Each team was scored and their team's score also became the contestant's individual score. For round 5 (sketch), the contestants were paired up and there were 5 performances. Similarly to round 4, each pair was scored, which then became both contestants' individual scores. Aggregates of the points received by all performers each round were given to the mentor of that week. The best mentor was revealed in the grand finale and Naveen Richard came first and Kaneez Surka and Kenny Sebastian were first and second runners-up, respectively.

For the grand finale, the top 5 contestants performed in the Royal Opera House, Mumbai on 20 December 2017. They were allowed to perform in any of the 7 forms of comedy they were mentored in, including a combination of them. They were scored in a similar process as the previous rounds however, the scores were not aggregated with their previous scores. At the end, Nishant Suri, the contestant with the highest score, won the competition along with prize money of 10,00,000.

Selection process and format Season 2
On 10 October 20, auditions for Season 2 took place. This year the top 22 applicants auditioned for the judges in Mumbai itself on the main Comicstaan set. Applicants had to submit an application to the Comicstaan website and then the shortlisted few (around 100 people) met with producers and submitted themselves for vigorous background checks. The top few were invited to Mumbai to audition for the judges. The judges debated and scored the top 22 and based on an 8-hour gruelling debate session, they select the top 10 contestants. 
 
During the shows, the 10 contestants went through 7 rounds of performances to secure a spot in the grand finale. Each round, the contestants performed in a different genre of comedy and, unlike most competition television series, there were no eliminations till the last round. Comedic genres the contestants performed in included anecdotal, topical, observational, improv, sketch, comedy of terrors, and alternative comedy.

Before each round, the contestants were mentored in each genre by one of the judges, who is touted as the expert of that specific type of comedy. The contestants had a week to prepare fresh material and practice before performing that set live in front of an audience and the judges. After their performance, each contestant was given a score between 1 and 10, by both the audience and all the judges (except for the expert for that round). Each contestant was given feedback by the judges before revealing their score. Two separate scores were revealed to each contestant - an average of the audience's score and an average of the judges'. The mean of both scores became the final score of the round for each contestant. The final scores were aggregated each round and at the end of the 7th round, 5 contestants receiving the best aggregate scores were given places in the finale.
 
For the grand finale, the top 5 contestants perform in any of the 7 forms of comedy they were mentored in, including a combination of them. They are scored in a similar process however, the scores were not aggregated with their previous scores. In the end,  the highest scorer wins the competition along with prize money of ₹10,00,000.

Contestants

Season 1
 Nishant Suri (from Noida, Uttar Pradesh) - Winner
 Shankar Chugani (from Coonoor, Tamil Nadu)
 Rahul Dua (from Ludhiana, Punjab) - Runner-up
 Rueben Kaduskar (from Mumbai, Maharashtra)
 Shashwat Maheshwari (from Kanpur, Uttar Pradesh)
 Saurav Mehta (from Kolkata, West Bengal)
 Arnav Rao (from Chennai, Tamil Nadu)
 Aishwarya Mohanraj (from Mumbai, Maharashtra)
 Prashashti Singh (from Amethi, Uttar Pradesh) - 2nd runner-up
 Sejal Bhat (from Bangalore, Karnataka)

Season 2
 Shreeja Chaturvedi (From Mumbai, Maharashtra)
 Joel D’Souza (from Mumbai, Maharashtra)
 Rohan Gujral (from Mumbai, Maharashtra)
 Aakash Gupta (from New Delhi) - Winner
 Supriya Joshi (from Mumbai, Maharashtra)
 Samay Raina (from Jammu and Kashmir) - Winner
 Raunaq Rajani (from Mumbai, Maharashtra)
 Ramya Ramapriya (from Bangalore, Karnataka)
 Devanshi Shah (from Mumbai, Maharashtra)
 Sumit Sourav (from Jamshedpur, Jharkhand)

Season 3
 Adesh Nichit (from Baghpat, Uttar Pradesh)
 Shreya Priyam (from Patna, Bihar)
 Aashish Solanki (from New Delhi) - Winner
 Natiq Hasan (from New Delhi)
 Shamik Chakrabarti (from Bangalore, Karnataka)
 Gurleen Pannu (from Chandigarh) - Runner-up
 Pavitra Shetty (from Mumbai, Maharashtra)
 Aman Jotwani (from Mumbai, Maharashtra) - 2nd runner-up

Summary

Season 1

 Team Bananas
 Team Ek Sithaphal
Red numbers Lowest Score
Green numbers Highest Score
Note (*): This episode score is excluding the Audience's Average Score and only Judges' Average Score.
 Eliminated
 Winner
 Runner-Up
 2nd Runner-Up

Season 2

 Team Kadak Khopdis (English Translation: Hard Headed)
 Team Lazy Lakadbagghey (English Translation: Lazy Hyenas)
Red numbers Lowest Score
Green numbers Highest Score
Note (*): This episode score is excluding the Audience's Average Score and only Judges' Average Score.
 Eliminated
 Winner
 3rd Place
 4th Place

Season 3 

 Team Lallupops
 Team Bubblugums
Red numbers Lowest Score
Green numbers Highest Score
Maroon numbers Over-time Minus Score
Purple numbers Mentor's choice to give +0.5 Score
Note (*): This episode score is excluding the Audience's Average Score and only Judges' Average Score.
 Eliminated
 Winner
 Runner-Up
 3rd Place

Comicstaan Semma Comedy Pa (Tamil)

Selection process and format 
After two spectacular seasons in Hindi, Comicstaan has expanded in Tamil Language. In 2019, auditions took place, applicants had to submit an application to the comicstaan website and then the shortlisted few met with producers and submitted themselves for vigorous background checks. Then top 6 contestants were selected.

During the shows, the 6 contestants went through 7 rounds of performances to secure a spot in the grand finale. Each round, the contestants performed in a different genre of comedy and, unlike most competition television series, there were no eliminations till the last round. Comedic genres the contestants performed in included anecdotal, topical, observational, sketch, comedy of terror and character work.

Before each round, the contestants were mentored in each genre by one of the judges, who is touted as the expert of that specific type of comedy. The contestants had a week to prepare fresh material and practice before performing that set live in front of an audience and the judges. After their performance, each contestant was given a score between 1 and 10, by both the audience and all the judges (except for the expert for that round). Each contestant was given feedback by the judges before revealing their score. Two separate scores were revealed to each contestant - an average of the audience's score and an average of the judges'. The mean of both scores became the final score of the round for each contestant. The final scores were aggregated each round and at the end of the 7th round, 3 contestants receiving the best aggregate scores were given places in the finale.

For the grand finale, the top 3 contestants perform in any of the 7 forms of comedy they were mentored in, including a combination of them. They are scored in a similar process however, the scores were not aggregated with their previous scores. In the end,  the highest scorer wins the competition along with prize money of ₹10,00,000.

Hosts and Judges

Contestants 
 Mayandi Karunanithi
 Karthigeyan Durai
 Syama Harini
 Yogesh Jagannathan
 Abishek Kumar
 Annamalai Lakshmanan

Summary 

Red numbers Lowest Score
 Green numbers Highest Score
 Note (*): This episode score is excluding the Audience's Average Score and only Judges' Average Score.
  Eliminated
  Winner
  1st Runner-up
  2nd Runner-up

References

External links
 
 

2018 Indian television series debuts
Amazon Prime Video original programming
Indian stand-up comedy television series
Indian reality television series